"Surprise!" is Bonnie Pink's second single. The single was released under the Pony Canyon label on April 16, 1996.

Track listing 

1996 singles
Bonnie Pink songs
Pony Canyon singles
1996 songs
Songs written by Bonnie Pink